Wirtland is an internet-based micronation founded in 2008.

Media reaction
Fox News and Bulgarian national bTV were the first TV channels to report on Wirtland. bTV organized an online interview with three witizens of Bulgarian origin on February 11, 2009 whilst Fox 45 Morning News of Baltimore, Maryland featured an interview about Wirtland with reporter Larry Fiorino on January 20, 2009. On November 4, 2011, Wirtland appeared on Slovenian TV channel Sponka.tv. In February 2015 Spain's premier radio Cadena SER published interview with Wirtland's representative. On July 29, 2015, Wirtland was covered on main Bolivian TV channel Red ATB. Wirtland has also been covered by CNN Türk, Voice of Russia, PC World, Computerworld, Milliyet, Sabah, Dneven Trud.

Wirtland's coins

In 2009, Wirtland released its first gold coin, the "Wirtland Crane" (10 International Currency Units, ICU). The Wirtland Crane – a 1/10 oz. coin minted in 24 carat gold - became the world's first gold coin produced by an internet-based (virtual) country. The gold "Crane" was soon followed by the first silver coin, similarly titled the "Silver Crane" (2 ICU).

References

Further reading
 Kristan J. Wheaton, Wirtland: A New (?) Experimental (??) Cyber (???) Nation (????), Sources And Methods, November 30, 2008.
 CNN Turkey, İşte "Hayalistan"ın en güzel kızı!, November 11, 2009.
 The Scavenger, Wirtland: Fantasy or reality?, The Scavenger,12 December 2010.
 Veldmuis.com, Virtuele bewoners willen eigen ‘virtuele straatnamen’, Veldmuis.com, November 9, 2008.

Micronations
Internet properties established in 2008
Websites
Identity documents